Agriphila sakayehamana is a moth in the family Crambidae. It was described by Shōnen Matsumura in 1925. It is found in Russia's Sakhalinisland and Japan.

References

Crambini
Moths described in 1925
Moths of Asia